Seneca may refer to:

People, fictional characters and language
 Seneca (name), a list of people and fictional characters with the given name or surname

Seneca the Elder, a Roman rhetorician, writer and father of the stoic philosopher Seneca
Seneca the Younger, a Roman Stoic philosopher, statesman, dramatist
 Seneca people, one of the six Iroquois tribes of North America
 Seneca language, the language of the Seneca people

Places

United States

Communities
 Seneca, California, an unincorporated community
 Seneca, Illinois, a village
 Seneca, Kansas, a city
 Seneca, Keweenaw County, Michigan, an unincorporated community
 Seneca, Maryland, an unincorporated community
 Seneca, Missouri, a city
 Seneca, Nebraska, a village
 Seneca, New Mexico, an unincorporated community 
 Seneca, New York, a town in Ontario County
 Seneca, Oregon, a city
 Seneca, Pennsylvania, a census-designated place
 Seneca, South Carolina, a city
 Seneca, South Dakota, a town
 Seneca, Wisconsin (disambiguation), various places
 Seneca County, New York
 Seneca County, Ohio
 Seneca Township (disambiguation)
 Seneca Village, New York, a former settlement in Manhattan that was displaced to create Central Park

Water features
 Seneca Creek (North Fork South Branch Potomac River), West Virginia
 Seneca Creek (Potomac River), Maryland
 Seneca Lake (New York), the largest of the Finger Lakes
 Senecaville Lake or Seneca Lake, Ohio, a reservoir
 Seneca River (New York), the outlet of Seneca Lake
 Seneca River (South Carolina)

Other places
 Seneca Army Depot, Seneca County, New York
 Seneca Caverns (Ohio)
 Seneca Caverns (West Virginia)
 Seneca Historic District (disambiguation)
 Seneca Park, Louisville, Kentucky
 Seneca Rocks, a large crag and local landmark in West Virginia

Canada
 Seneca Township, a historic township in Haldimand County, Ontario

Outer space
 Seneca (crater), a lunar crater
 2608 Seneca, an asteroid

Brands and enterprises
 Seneca (cigarette), a brand of additive-free cigarettes
 Seneca Data, an American custom computer manufacturer and technology distributor
 Seneca Foods, a major fruit and vegetable processor
 Seneca Oil, an American oil company formed in 1858

Education
 Seneca College, Toronto, Ontario, Canada
 Seneca Institute – Seneca Junior College, an African-American school in Seneca, South Carolina, from 1899 to 1939
 Seneca High School (disambiguation), various schools in the United States

Music
 Senakah (formerly Seneca), an alternative rock band from Limerick, Ireland
 "Seneca", a song from the 2001 album Standards by the band Tortoise

Aircraft
 Piper PA-34 Seneca, a light twin-engine aircraft
 YH-41 Seneca, a US Army version of the Cessna CH-1 helicopter

Ships
 USS Seneca, five US Navy ships
 USCGC Seneca (1908), a US Coast Guard cutter, decommissioned in 1936
 USCGC Seneca (WMEC-906), a US Coast Guard cutter

Train stations
Seneca Avenue (BMT Myrtle Avenue Line), a station of the New York City Subway
Seneca station (Buffalo Metro Rail), a railway station in Buffalo, New York, US
Seneca Station (Illinois), a Chicago, Rock Island and Pacific Railroad station in Seneca, Illinois

Other uses
 Seneca Presbyterian Church, Stanley, New York, on the US National Register of Historic Places
 LORAN-C transmitter Seneca, a radio navigation transmitter operated by the U.S. Coast Guard